Sir Alexander Lauder of Fountainhall, 4th Baronet (6 November 1698 – 17 May 1730) succeeded to the baronetcy of his father, Sir John Lauder, 3rd Baronet in February 1728. He was made an Honorary Burgess of the City of Glasgow on 16 September of that year, and of the burgh of Aberdeen on 15 August 1729. He died unmarried and was interred in the Lauder burial vault within Greyfriars Kirk.

He was succeeded by his next younger brother, Sir Andrew Lauder, 5th Baronet.

References
 Monumental Inscriptions in Greyfriars Churchyard, by James Brown, Edinburgh, 1864, pp: 301–302, for the burial vault within the church of the family of Lauder of Lauder, and all who are contained therein.
 The Complete Baronetage by G. E. Cokayne, Exeter, 1904, vol. IV, p. 361.

1698 births
1730 deaths
Baronets in the Baronetage of Nova Scotia
Nobility from Edinburgh
Burials at Greyfriars Kirkyard